Robin Banks is a TV presenter, narrator and radio DJ originally from Kilkenny, Ireland.

Career
He was the narrator of the British/European version of the popular Discovery Channel show MythBusters, from season 2 to the present day. He has worked as a reporter for the Bravo television show Bravado. He has also presented shows for the BBC, Channel 4, Sky1, Living, on London's Kiss 100 and has reportedly presented several guest shows on Galaxy FM. He has previously had radio shows on Radio Nova, Atlantic 252, Virgin Radio, Beat 106 and Xfm.

On 16 June 2008, Robin Banks joined Leicester radio station Leicester Sound to host the weekday 6am10am breakfast show, but was let go due to financial constraints.

On 1 September 2008, Banks appeared on Dragons' Den, under his real name, Christian Richardson, to pitch for investment in the eco-friendly packaging suppliers Tiny Box Company that he helped set up. He and his business partner Rachel Watkyn secured an investment of £60,000 (more than they asked for) from Dragons Theo Paphitis and Peter Jones.

On 7 March 2009, Robin Banks made a post on Discovery Channel UK forums revealing that he will shortly return as the series narrator for MythBusters. He mentioned that it would not be possible without fans supporting him, thus wanting him back. He has narrated MythBusters for 6 series in the UK, Europe and Asia.

From March 2010 he also narrates Dirty Jobs for Discovery Channel. Banks presented the weekday evening show for Orion Media's network of West Midlands stations (BRMB, Beacon, Mercia and Wyvern). He left the company in July 2011.

Banks offers Radio Coaching (coaches worldwide), runs Radio Workshops and has consulted for a number of businesses.

Between November 2012 and October 2013 he was the Programme Director at Star Radio North East. He has moved onto new projects after fulfilling his brief to revamp the station and improve its audience figures.

At the beginning of March 2014 he joined Jack FM Berkshire, the relaunched Reading 107, to front the breakfast show.

From September 2016, Banks is working as content director with Hi FM in Oman, including presenting the weekday breakfast show. He is also responsible for all output.

In the early 2020s, he was one of the presenting team for UMG's range of Now and Clubland branded music television channels alongside Pat Sharp, Simon Bates and Mark Goodier. Programmes he narrated for the channels included Antiques Rockshow with Robin Banks for Now 90s and Robin's 50 Dead Catchy Choruses! for Clubland.

References

External links
 RobinBanks.com
 

1972 births
Living people
Irish DJs
Irish radio presenters
Irish television presenters
People from County Kilkenny
Radio personalities from the Republic of Ireland
Irish expatriates in Oman